The 1989 Singaporean presidential election was held to elect the next president of Singapore.  Wee Kim Wee was re-elected by the Parliament of Singapore. 

During the election, 69 members of Parliament were present and 13 members were absent.

Wee was sworn in for his second term as president on 2 September 1989.

Results

References

Presidential elections in Singapore
Singapore
Presidential election